Miss Israel is a national beauty pageant in Israel. The pageant was founded in 1950, where the winners were sent to Miss Universe. The pageant was also existing to send delegates to Miss World, Miss International, Miss Europe and Miss Asia Pacific International. The 1979 competition was held in Yad Eliyahu Arena, Tel Aviv, and had 22 contestants. Vered Polgar was the winner.

Results

References
"Miss Israel 1979", Jewish Post, Indianapolis, Marion County, 22 June 1979

1979 beauty pageants
1979 in Israel
1970s in Tel Aviv
Miss Israel